Mavreli is a mountain village in the municipality of Meteora, Trikala regional unit, Greece.

External links
Νομαρχιακή Αυτοδιοίκηση Τρικάλων - Αρχική Σελίδα

Populated places in Trikala (regional unit)